Suzukia is a genus of plants in the family Lamiaceae, first described in 1930. It contains two known species, native to Taiwan and the Ryukyu Islands (part of Japan).

Species
 Suzukia luchuensis Kudô - Lü Tao Island (also called Green Island) of Taiwan, Nansei-shoto (called the Ryukyu Islands) of Japan
 Suzukia shikikunensis Kudô - Taiwan

References

Lamiaceae
Lamiaceae genera